Hoaxmap – News from the rumor mill – is a project created on the personal initiative of Karolin Schwarz, an ethnologist of African studies from Leipzig, Germany. Since February 8, 2016, the website hoaxmap.org is online, starting with a list of 177 hoaxes. In June 2016, 400 hoaxes were recorded with origin or reference point, including evidence of inaccuracy.

Most of the false reports and rumors consist of defamation against refugees caught up in the European migrant crisis. Schwarz receives subtle threats from the political right. Other people thanked her for clarification. The hoax usually is spread due to prejudices of those holding a simplistic view, dividing the world into good and evil, and with a lack of media literacy. News and broadcasts from Australia, USA, Arabia and Germany reported about the Hoaxmap project. In April 2016 Hoaxmap was nominated for Grimme Online Award.

Besides positive feedback, subtle threats were sent to Schwarz.

In 2018 local news reduced reporting about false information, following which Hoaxmap could not list such rumors as refuted.

The map has drawn on data from other aggregators such as Mimikama.

External links
https://hoaxmap.org/ – Website
List of rumors and hoaxes

References

Anti-racism in Germany
German websites
Investigative journalism
European migrant crisis
Fact-checking websites